Kematen may refer to the following places in Austria:

 Kematen am Innbach, Upper Austria
 Kematen an der Krems, Upper Austria
 Kematen in Tirol, Tyrol
 Kematen an der Ybbs, Lower Austria